Martin Khuber (born January 23, 1992 in Almaty, Kazakhstan) is an alpine skier from Kazakhstan. He competed for Kazakhstan at the 2014 Winter Olympics in the alpine skiing events.

References

External links
 
 
 

1992 births
Living people
Olympic alpine skiers of Kazakhstan
Alpine skiers at the 2014 Winter Olympics
Kazakhstani male alpine skiers
Sportspeople from Almaty
Competitors at the 2017 Winter Universiade